

Incumbents

Events

August
August 5–21 — 87 athletes from Poland compete at the 2016 Summer Olympics in Rio de Janeiro, Brazil

September
September 3 — Poland win the eighteenth edition of the Eurovision Young Musicians in Cologne, Germany.

December
From December 8 — State Owned PZU together with Polish Development Fund acquired Bank Pekao, Poland's second largest bank previously owned by UniCredit, by buying a 32.8 per cent stake in the bank for the amount of PLN 10.6 billion (EUR 2.6 billion).
From December 16 — protests against law limiting of freedom of the press.

References

See also
 2016 in Polish television

 
2010s in Poland
Years of the 21st century in Poland
Poland
Poland